Kemba Nelson (born 23 February 2000) is a Jamaican sprinter competing for the Oregon Ducks in American collegiate track and field. She is the collegiate record holder in the women's 60 metres with a time of 7.05 seconds, which she set when winning the final at the NCAA Division I Indoor Championships in March 2021.

Athletics career

Mount Alvernia High and the University of Technology
Nelson first started competing in track and field at Mount Alvernia High School in Montego Bay, Jamaica—a school not known for its track and field program—coached by Lawrence Mendez her first year and later Andrew Henry. In her last year (2017) she was second in the class 2 (15–16 years) girls' 100 metres and fourth in the 200 metres at the Jamaican high school Boys and Girls Championships.

Nelson then attended the University of Technology (UTech) in Jamaica from 2018 to 2020, where she was coached by Paul Francis at the MVP Track and Field Club. In her first year she placed third in the women's 100 metres at the 2018 Jamaican Under-20 Championships and ran on the 4 × 100 metres relay at the 2018 World Under-20 Championships, though the Jamaican team was unable to advance after being disqualified in the semi-finals for stepping out of their lane.

In 2019 she qualified to represent Jamaica in the under-20 category for the CARIFTA Games. She placed third in the women's 100 metres and teamed up with 100 metres champion Briana Williams, Kimone Reid, and 100 metres hurdles champion Ackera Nugent in the 4 × 100 metres relay, anchoring the team to gold. At the Jamaican Under-20 Championships she won the women's 100 metres and 200 metres in personal best times of 11.49 and 23.57 seconds respectively, and then went on to be a 100 metres finalist for Jamaica at both the Pan American Under-20 Championships and the North American, Central American, and Caribbean Under-23 Championships.

Oregon transfer and 2021 indoor season
Because of the COVID-19 pandemic, Nelson barely competed and spent most of 2020 addressing injuries instead. She also wanted more competition than she thought the Jamaican intercollegiate scene could provide, so in October 2020 she transferred to the American University of Oregon in Eugene, Oregon on an athletic scholarship for the Oregon Ducks, coached by Curtis Taylor. In her first indoor meet (Razorback Invitational) for the Oregon Ducks on 30 January 2021, she placed second in the 200 metres with a personal best time of 23.53 seconds, and then defeated the 2019 NCAA Division I champion and collegiate leader Twanisha Terry over 60 metres in a time of 7.19 seconds.

On 13 March at the 2021 NCAA Division I Indoor Championships she improved in the women's 60 metres semi-finals with a time of 7.13 seconds, though Terry remained the favorite after she too improved her personal best to 7.09 seconds. However, Nelson again defeated Terry in the final with a collegiate record of 7.05 seconds, the second fastest time in the world that year. Nelson was surprised by the performance which gave more confidence to herself as well as her high school alma mater, though Mount Alvernia coach Andrew Henry was not surprised by the win, telling The Gleaner after the race: "It doesn't matter where she's at, from the moment she in a final, her aim is always to win and it doesn't matter who's she's up against, she's focused on what her objectives are".

2021 outdoor season
Nelson started the outdoor season on 27 March with her first sub-23 seconds (though wind-assisted with +2.5 m/s wind velocity) 200 metres race with a time of 22.79 seconds to win at the Aztec Invitational in San Diego. She competed at the USATF Grand Prix in the University of Oregon's renovated Hayward Field on 24 April, winning her 100 metres semi final in a wind-assisted (+2.4 m/s wind velocity) time of 11.08 seconds ahead of Olympic champions Allyson Felix and Tianna Bartoletta. In the final Nelson finished fifth in 11.22 seconds, several meters behind Blessing Okagbare who won in 10.97 seconds, but Nelson didn't expect to win even her semi-final and called it a "very, very good experience".

On 27 May, at the 2021 NCAA West Preliminary in College Station, Texas for the 2021 NCAA Division I Championships, Nelson lead the first round results with her first sub-11 seconds race with a time of 10.91 seconds. The wind was again over the limit for record purposes at +2.1 m wind, but she again ran under 11 seconds two days later in the quarter finals with a 10.98 seconds personal best in almost still conditions (+0.1 m/s wind), qualifying for the 2021 NCAA Division I Championships in June.

Personal life
Nelson is an undergrad at the University of Oregon studying applied economics, business and society, and plans to pursue a masters in finance.

Personal best statistics

Information from World Athletics.

See also
 2020/21 in 60 metres

References

External links

 (Track & Field Results Reporting System)
Video of Kemba Nelson's 60 metres collegiate record by the NCAA via YouTube

2000 births
Living people
People from Montego Bay
Jamaican female sprinters
Oregon Ducks women's track and field athletes
United States collegiate record holders in athletics (track and field)
21st-century Jamaican women
Commonwealth Games bronze medallists for Jamaica
Commonwealth Games medallists in athletics
Athletes (track and field) at the 2022 Commonwealth Games
Medallists at the 2022 Commonwealth Games